Schiffermuellerina grandis is a moth of the family Oecophoridae. It is found in Europe.

The wingspan is about 15 mm. The moth flies from May to June depending on the location.

The larvae feed on bark and decayed wood.

References

External links
 Schiffermuellerina grandis at UKmoths

Oecophorinae
Moths described in 1842